Hog Harbour is a village in the island of Espiritu Santo in Vanuatu.

It is located in northeast Santo, in close proximity to Port Olry village.

History
The village is a strong base of Presbyterian Church. In 1897, Dr Bowie, who was then a Scottish missionary had first established Presbyterian Church mission in Hog Harbour. The name Hog Harbour had derived from when the explorers in the Island had then anchored in the harbour, amazingly they saw that the harbour was then full of pigs, in light of this, they named it Hog Harbour. During the time of the British–French Condominium, Hog Harbour was then the site of the British district administration.

British biologist John R. Baker (1928) reported to have seen "no fewer than 125 intersex [pigs] in one single day at Hog Harbour" (see also Narave pig).

Population
Hog Harbour to date has changed dramatically, with the village growing rapidly in population size and development is taking lead as well . The village has a population of approximately 1,000 people. It has English primary and secondary schools respectively. It has a dispensary which provides medical intervention to the locals. There is a large Presbyterian Church building which is located at the top of the village's tiny hill. The vast majority of people are members of the Presbyterian Church.

The village has a local chief, who presides over matters and disputes among villagers.

Transportation
As regards transportation, it has improved dramatically. There are many transport vehicles in the village. They provide daily services for people to Luganville, which is the capital city of Santo. Everybody uses this form of transport to transport their goods to be sold in Luganville.

Sports
In light of sports, there is a soccer field located at the centre of the village. Young villagers use the field to play soccer. Rugby is occasionally played on this soccer field. Young people however tended to prefer playing the former rather than the latter.

Notes

Populated places in Vanuatu
Sanma Province